Rajendran Mani (born 1975) is an Indian bodybuilder and has worked in the Indian Air Force from Tamil Nadu, Chennai.

References

External links
  

Indian bodybuilders
Sportspeople from Chennai
1974 births
Living people